Yuli Rachmawati (15 July 1980 – 10 June 2017), better known as Julia Perez (abbreviated as Jupe), was an Indonesian actress, singer, model, announcer, and businesswoman. In the early 2010s, she became known for her outspoken statements against conservative Muslim clerics, who deemed her too sexy or "pornographic" for Indonesian audiences.

In 2014, she revealed that she had been diagnosed with Stage 2 cervical cancer. By 2016, the cancer had reached Stage 4 and she died in June 2017.

Biography
Julia Perez was born Yuli Rachmawati in on 15 July 1980 in Jakarta, Indonesia, as the oldest daughter to Sri Wulansih (b. May 15, 1963) and Angkasa Djaya (August 7, 1961 – December 2, 2013). Her father played football for a club in Bandar Lampung city, and her mother, who played women's football for Caprina Cijantung Club in Jakarta She was of mixed Sunda and Betawi ancestry. Her parents divorced some time around 1988, when Julia was still a child. Her mother had to take on odd jobs to support the family. Her mother later married Sakib ‘Sammy’ Mahri, who owns a welding business and rental properties.

After leaving high school, Julia studied at InterStudi Secretarial Academy in Jakarta, at the behest of an older female friend, who also paid for her tuition and advised her to find a bule (white foreigner) boyfriend. She then worked for a furniture company run by a Dutchman. She began dating the owner's son, who invited her to work in the Netherlands. She accepted the offer and spent three years in the Netherlands, studying Dutch and working as a secretary.

On a holiday to Spain, she met French model Damien Perez. They were married in France on 7 October 2002. They had no children. Jupe said she was putting her career before starting a family. She suffered a miscarriage in 2007. In 2009, she became close to an Argentine soccer player, Gaston Castaño, who then played for Indonesian club Persiba Balikpapan and went on to play for several other Indonesian clubs. In 2010, Julia and Damien were divorced. She blamed the failure of their marriage on Damien's alleged womanizing.

In 2013, Julia and Gaston announced their engagement. They were quietly married in Sydney, Australia, on 26 September 2013. Their wedding was kept a virtual secret from Indonesia's media. Julia's mother had opposed the idea of her daughter marrying a football player. On 12 May 2016, South Jakarta District Court granted Julia a divorce and awarded her alimony of Rp15 million per month.

Julia's biological father, Angkasa Jaya, was arrested in 2012 for alleged possession of drugs. He died in December 2013.

In 2015, Julia Perez earned her Sarjana Hukum (Bachelor of Law) from Universitas Bung Karno.

Career
After starting out as a secretary in Jakarta, Julia moved to the Netherlands for further secretarial work. Her ensuing relationship with Damien Perez opened doors for her to model for FHM and Maxim magazines in France. Following her layouts in FHM and Maxim, Jupe was nominated as one of the 100 Sexiest Women in the World.

Around 2002, she returned to Indonesia for a holiday to help her younger sister attend a casting session for a soap opera, but the director ended up recruiting Julia, who embarked upon an acting career. She appeared in late-night ribald comedy shows, with titles such as Komedi Nakal (Naughty Comedy). She gained further exposure and popularity by starring as a lifeguard dressed in a red swimsuit in an unofficial Indonesian version of Baywatch called Penjaga Pantai (Beach Guards).

She went on to appear in local soap operas, variety shows and horror movies, and also became a popular dangdut singer. Her debut album Kamasutra, released in 2008, included a free condom, which upset conservative Islamic organizations and resulted in her being banned from performing in several cities. In 2008, she was banned from performing at a concert commemorating Indonesia's 17 August Independence Day at a red-light area in Pekanbaru, Riau province.

In 2012, Perez launched a chicken fast-food chain called Jupe Fried Chicken (JFC).

Politics
In March 2010, Julia Perez told the press that eight political parties had asked her to run for the position of Regent of Pacitan regency in East Java province, even though she had never visited Pacitan. She said the parties courting her for the December 2010 local election included the People's Conscience Party (Hanura), the Great Indonesia Movement Party (Gerindra) and the National Mandate Party (PAN). Her candidacy led to accusations that political parties were putting personalities before policies and experience, whereas her supporters countered that her inexperience in political corruption and her opposition to conservative Islam made her a worthy candidate. In August 2010, Julia announced she had pulled out of the election, saying it was her own decision.

In the run-up to Indonesia's 2014 presidential election, contested between populist Joko 'Jokowi' Widodo and former general Prabowo Subianto, Jupe publicly offered to marry Prabowo, who had never remarried since divorcing former president Suharto's second daughter, Titiek Suharto. Julia tweeted on 19 May 2014: "Dear Mr Prabowo, Jupe is ready for a marriage proposal whenever you want.. You want to be president [and] need a wife, Jupe is ready sir." Prabowo responded on Twitter by thanking Julia for her support. Julia later said her offer did not mean that she supported Prabowo's presidential bid as she was neutral. On 5 June 2014, Jupe said she had decided to support Jokowi because Prabowo had broken her heart as he already had a girlfriend.

Ahead of Jakarta's 2017 gubernatorial election, Jupe voiced support for the incumbent, Basuki Tjahaja Purnama, better known as Ahok, who ended up losing the election and was then jailed for blasphemy against Islam. Jupe had initially considered Ahok to be fierce and creepy, but upon meeting him in March 2016 she declared him to be warm and friendly. She praised his urban planning and efforts to combat Jakarta's notorious floods and traffic. She also lauded his honesty, saying it was very difficult to find honest leaders in Indonesia.

Other activities
In 2006, Julia became an ambassador for the All Indonesia Chess Association (PERCASI), which held the "Julia Perez Rapid Chess Open Tournament" in Jakarta on 5 October 2006.

In 2010, Julia founded the Champions Soccer School (CSS) in Jakarta, with the aim of improving the football prowess of Indonesian children by providing "Latin American-style" training from Argentine and Chilean coaches. She said CSS was not intended to be a money-making operation, but was inspired by her love of football. She fondly recalled playing football as a child with her parents and siblings in Cijantung, East Jakarta. CSS was based in Kuningan, South Jakarta, and subsequently opened coaching clinics at Bung Karno Stadium and in Simprug, South Jakarta. The school's first batch of 14 participants received free training. Subsequent participants, who had an average age of 10 to 13 years, were required to pay a Rp 1 million registration fee, plus an additional Rp 1 million for a 10-week course. Former participants recall Jupe often monitoring the training, encouraging them to exercise and sharing her passion for the game.

Julia Perez served as manager of Indonesia's Team Garuda at the 21st President's Cup International Amateur Boxing Tournament held in Jakarta over 3–9 July 2011. Jupe said her presence fired up the team's performance. She was also enthusiastic about the team, commenting: "The other day, I wanted to see the boxers being weighed. When I went in the room, why are they all naked? Apparently, one has to strip to be weighed. What can I say, that's my luck."

One million followers
On 7 August 2012, Julia Perez performed a pole dance at a traffic light in Kuningan, Central Jakarta, to keep a promise after reaching one million Twitter followers. She was not dressed too skimpily as it was the Muslim fasting month of Ramadhan, although she still displayed some of her ample cleavage.

Controversies

Porn star accusation by MUI
The Indonesia Ulema Council (MUI), Indonesia's top Muslim authority, in October 2011 accused Julia of being a porn star. Rather than start wearing a Muslim headscarf, she responded by demanding a meeting with MUI and challenged the clerics to show any evidence of pornography. She also jokingly apologized for being sexy.

Physical clash and jail
On 11 October 2011, East Jakarta District Court sentenced Perez to three months in jail with six months probation for assaulting Dewi Persik during a cat-fight on the set of the horror film Arwah Goyang Karawang (The Dancing Spirit of Karawang). Perez filed an appeal to the Supreme Court, which rejected the appeal and annulled her probation period. She was ordered to begin serving her sentence on 14 February 2013, but she disappeared. On 18 March 2013, officers forcibly removed her from her house and took her to Pondok Bambu women's penitentiary in East Jakarta. She was released on 17 June 2013, after which she distributed korans at seven mosques.

Perez name
In August 2013, Julia told the press she should pay Rp1 billion ($95,200) per year, if she still wanted to use the Perez name after her divorce from Damien Perez. She said she would change her name, but she remained known as Julia Perez.

Censorship
In January 2012, the Indonesian Broadcasting Commission (KPI) sent an official warning letter to commercial television network ANTV over 28 December 2011 broadcast of talk-show Tri Angels, which featured a close-up of co-host Julia Perez's cleavage and a discussion about sex. KPI warned the network not to produce any more content of "excessive sexual exploitation".

In February 2012, Julia's song Jupe Paling Suka 69 (Jupe Likes 69 Best) was among 10 dangdut songs banned by the West Nusa Tenggara Regional Broadcasting Commission (KPID) from radio and television airplay on the grounds of having “pornographic” lyrics. In 2016, the same song was banned by West Java's KPID. Banten province in western Java also banned the song in 2016.

Condom ambassador
In 2013, Julia was named ambassador for Indonesia's National Condom Week, an event aimed at raising awareness for the prevention of HIV/AIDS. The event was canceled after conservative Islamic groups claimed it promoted promiscuity.

Relationship with FPI
In December 2010, the Islamic Defenders Front (FPI) threatened to report female celebrities to police over "vulgar" online photos. Jupe said she would not make any drastic changes to her appearance as she wanted to remain sensual. FPI then praised Jupe for promising to improve her appearance.

In December 2011, FPI members in the West Java capital of Bandung branded Julia a "temptress" and demanded she be banned from performing in the city.

Julia's spiritual adviser was Habib Selon (real name: Salim Al Athas, 1969-2015), who was head of the Jakarta chapter of FPI. When deadly floods hit Jakarta in mid-January 2013, Julia accompanied Selon on a visit to the inundated neighborhood of Kampung Bukit Duri to hand out food and water aid. Some Muslims later criticized Selon because Julia had been wearing a figure-hugging T-shirt, whereas Selon and the FPI had in 2012 successfully campaigned to have Lady Gaga banned from performing in Jakarta because of her "indecent" clothes. Julia had in 2012 urged Lady Gaga to ignore the ban, tweeting: "Dear mother @ladygaga please come to JKT! I dont care if they will hurt ME with bamboo or weapons! My blood is ur blood..please come i beg u *ban down*." She said she had personally made a bra from the thorny durian fruit as a gift for Gaga.

After Selon died of a heart attack in 2015, Jupe said he was like an older brother to her, and often gave her advice. She said they had planned to perform an umroh (minor haj pilgrimage) together in February 2016. She had also asked him to act as her guardian in the event she were to remarry.

Illness and death
In early October 2014, Perez announced she had visited Singapore to consider her options for having a baby via sperm donation—a prohibited procedure in Indonesia. There was speculation at the time that she was suffering cancer and wanted to have a baby before the cancer advanced. Later that same month, Perez revealed that seven months previously (around March 2014) she had been diagnosed with Stage 2a cervical cancer. She later clarified the cancer had been identified at Stage 1b. In Singapore, she underwent chemotherapy, radiation treatment and ovarian removal. In January 2015, she announced she was looking forward to returning to showbiz work, declaring she had completely recovered from the cancer. In April 2016, she appeared publicly with her head shaved, saying it was an act of support for cancer sufferers, especially women. Despite her treatment, the cancer spread and by December 2016 had reached Stage 4. In 2017, Perez was being treated in Jakarta's Cipto Mangunkusumo Hospital. She had become reliant on donations from friends and supporters to cover her heavy medical bills for chemotherapy and other treatment. Among those helping to pay her bills was Basuki Tjahaja Purnama, better known as Ahok, who had served as Jakarta governor. During Ahok's last visit to Julia in April 2017, he said she should not worry about paying her bills.

It was announced on 10 June 2017 that Perez had died of Stage 4 cervical cancer.

Filmography

Film

Television

Discography

Studio album

Soundtrack albums

Awards
In 2013, Julia was honored with three awards:
 Honorable Best Actress for Gending Sriwijaya film in Bandung Film Festival 2013
 Chosen Best Actress in Maya Cup 2013
 Best Female Actress for Gending Sriwijaya film in Royal Bali Film Festival

References

External links 
  Profile in KapanLagi.com

1980 births
2017 deaths
Indonesian dangdut singers
Indonesian female models
21st-century Indonesian women singers
Indonesian film actresses
Deaths from cervical cancer
Betawi people
Sundanese people
Deaths from cancer in Indonesia
Actresses from Jakarta
Singers from Jakarta
21st-century Indonesian actresses